Étienne Félix d'Henin de Cuvillers (1755–1841) was a French magnetizer and an early practitioner of mesmerism as a scientific discipline. He's best known for coining the term hypnotism.

Hénin de Cuvillers was a follower of Franz Anton Mesmer (1734–1815). However, unlike Mesmer he did not believe in the existence of a "magnetic fluid" in animal magnetism, and instead emphasized the role of mental processes in mesmerism. In his book  (The Enlightened Magnetism), he describes accounts of mesmeric effects in terms of belief and suggestibility.

He used these terms as early as 1820, and is believed by many to have coined these names.

References

French hypnotists
1755 births
1841 deaths
18th-century French people
19th-century French people